Mohammed Mohsin (born 3 April 1963), is a former Bangladeshi football player and coach. He spent his entire playing career with Brothers Union and captained the club alongside the Bangladesh national team, in 1979. Moshin was a member of the 1980 AFC Asian Cup squad. He is also considered to be one of the best forwards to ever play for Bangladesh and was a lethal marksman in the Dhaka League during the mid 1970s and early 1980s.

Success with Brothers Union
Although originally Moshin's inclination was towards athletics, while studying at Pogose School in Gopibagh, his fascination with football began. Seeing Mohsin's ball control and shooting power, Gafur Baloch who was the Brothers Union coach at the time, signed him up for the club, while still being in school.

In 1973, he got a chance to play in Brothers' Dhaka Third Division team, he repaid the clubs faith in him by scoring 39 goals including a hat-trick and a double hat-trick. The next year, he scored 22 goals while playing for the club in the Dhaka Second Division. In 1975, Brothers reached the Dhaka League, and at the time, most of the fans were eyeing Mohammedan-Abahani, but Brothers' Mohsin stood out separately. The club stunned local supporters by defeating defending champions Abahani during their first league game. At the time Brothers' also had future national team players Shahiduddin Ahmed Selim and Hasanuzzaman Bablu.

In 1980, Brothers enjoyed their first major trophy success  as they shared the Federation Cup title with Mohammedan SC, and the club soon seen in the same category with giants Abahani Limited Dhaka & Mohammedan. The final ended 0-0. This was the first edition of the competition. Later in the season, they defeated the black and whites 3-2 in an exciting league encounter, thanks to their talisman goal-scorer, Mohsin. This was also the only defeat that Mohammedan suffered that year. In 1981, Mohsin became the top scorer in the league with 20 goals including a double hat-trick. The same year when Moshin became leagues top scorer,  Brothers’, were joint champions of the prestigious Aga Khan Gold Cup along with Thai club Bangkok Bank FC, and not surprisingly, both Abahani and MSC were continuously after him. But he remained loyal to his boyhood team. Regarding not playing in a more popular team, Mohsin said "I am indebted to those at Brothers, it felt like my own club."

On 8 February 1982, A tragic accident at Khulna, during a friendly match in the off-season, meant that Mohsin’s football career ended prematurely. According to Moshin, while celebrating Brothers' Aga Khan Gold Cup triumph, he stayed at the club camp all night. The following morning fellow national team forward Abdus Salam Murshedy, advised him to play the Khulna League final for Khulna Muslim Club as a guest player. After arriving in Khulna early morning, Moshin took part in the final between Dada Match Factory and Khulna Muslim Club, now known as Khulna Mohammedan. In the second half, the game was tied at 1-1, and with only a few minutes left in the game, Moshin assisted the winner. While celebrating the audience started bursting crackers, and one of the crackers proceeded to hit Moshin on the shoulder, injuring him. Moshin was sent to Germany for better treatment, however, he did not regain his old form after returning to the field. He announced his retirement in 1985, playing his last league game for Brothers Union against Dhaka Wanderers. Mohsin had made the number 10 jersey of Brothers his own until his career ended.

International career

Bangladesh U19
Moshin made his debut for Bangladesh U19 during their unsuccessful 1977 AFC Youth Championship campaign, in Iran. The following year, Moshin captained the Bangladesh U19 team, during the 1978 AFC Youth Championship, which took place in Dhaka. While he was not part of the 41 selected players in Asian Youth Football Trials, he was later given a place in the team as captain, by Werner Bickelhaupt. Although the hosts could not advance from the group stages, Moshin's Bangladesh impressed supporters by going head on against much stronger teams. As this was the first international football tournament that took place after the country's independence, it was very highly anticipated by the locals, and the pressurized Bangladesh fell two goal behind during their first game against Singapore. However, goals from Ashish Bhadra and captain Moshin earned the hosts a hard fought draw. Bangladesh went onto win the next game against North Yemen, although they followed it up by losing to Kuwait. The last game of the group stages saw, Moshin rescue Bangladesh from defeat with his penalty against Bahrain.

Bangladesh national team
Mohsin made his senior international debut during 1976 Bangkok King's Cup, when Bangladesh lost to Malaysia and Thailand "B" team. He was also present with the national team, during the 1978 Bangkok Asian Games, which was the first time Bangladesh took part in the Asian Games. After finding success with the national youth team as the captain, Mohsin was made the captain of the national team during their game against Afghanistan at the 1980 AFC Asian Cup qualifier, held in Dhaka. Moshin also scored against Qatar in the qualifiers, as Bangladesh surprisingly made it to the main competition. In 1979, he was with the team for the 9th President's Cup in Seoul, South Korea, in preparations for the upcoming Asian Cup. Moshin later took part in the first President's Gold Cup in Dhaka in 1981. The national team consisting of Selim, Salam Murshedy, Aslam, Kazi Salahuddin, Bhadra, Chunnu & Moshin displayed one of their best performances in country's football history when they lost to much higher ranked North Korea 3-2, during the group stages of the 1980 AFC Asian Cup. However, Moshin's international career was soon cut short due to the horrific injury he suffered in 1981, and thus he could not repeat his performances with the youth team in senior level much longer.

Coaching career
While still playing for the club, Moshin served as the coach of Brothers Union, in 1984. He was also the coach of Wari Club and the Bangladesh Army. He was appointed as the coach of the Bangladesh youth team in a tournament held in Kerala, India in 1992.

In August 2008, Mohsin joined the Bangladesh Football Federation as a paid executive. He was given the job to find venues outside of Dhaka  for the then upcoming B.League season.

Personal life
Mohammed Moshin was born into a family from Chapainawabganj District of Rajshahi Division, although he was born in Rajshahi. Mohsin family consists of his wife and two children, Newaz Ani and Menhaj Abhi.

Honours

Brothers Union
 Dhaka Third Division Football League = 1973
 Dhaka Second Division Football League = 1974
 Federation Cup = 1980
 Aga Khan Gold Cup = 1981

Awards and accolades
1981 − Sports Writers Association's Best Footballer Award.
2012 − National Sports Award.

Individual
1973 − Dhaka Third Division top scorer
1974 − Dhaka Second Division top scorer
1980 − Dhaka League top scorer

References

Living people
1963 births
People from Rajshahi Division
Association football forwards
Bangladeshi footballers
Asian Games competitors for Bangladesh
Footballers at the 1978 Asian Games
Bangladesh youth international footballers
Bangladesh international footballers
Brothers Union players
1980 AFC Asian Cup players
Footballers from Dhaka
Recipients of the Bangladesh National Sports Award
Bangladeshi football managers
Pogose School alumni